The Chhapra–Lucknow Junction Express is an Express train belonging to North Eastern Railway zone that runs between  and  in India. It is currently being operated with 15053/15054 train numbers on a daily basis.

Service

The 15053/Chhapra–Lucknow Express has an average speed of 40 km/hr and covers 537 km in 13h 25m. The 15054/Lucknow Jn–Chhapra Express has an average speed of 37 km/hr and covers 537 km in 14h 20m.

Route and halts 
Notable halts of the train are:

Coach composition
The train has standard ICF rakes with a max speed of 110 kmph. The train consists of 17 coaches:

 1 AC II Tier
 2 AC III Tier
 7 Sleeper coaches
 5 General Unreserved
 2 Seating cum Luggage Rake

Traction
Both trains are hauled by a Gonda Loco Shed-based WDM-3A diesel locomotive from Chhapra to Lucknow and vice versa.

Rake sharing
The train currently shares its rake with Utsarg Express after the RSA of Utsarg Express was broken with Tatanagar–Chhapra Express because of the latter's extension to Thawe Junction.

See also 
 Chhapra Junction railway station
 Lucknow Junction railway station

Notes

References

External links 
 15053/Chhapra - Lucknow Express
 15054/Lucknow Jn - Chhapra Express

Transport in Chhapra
Passenger trains originating from Lucknow
Express trains in India
Rail transport in Bihar
Railway services introduced in 2015